Qudratullah is a male Muslim given name, meaning power of God. It may refer to

Historical 
Moulvi Syed Qudratullah Sattar Munsef, or just Syed Qudratullah (1750-1839), judge and founder of Moulvibazar
Qudratullah Katchil Sultan Muhammad Dipatuan Kudarat, or just Muhammad Kudarat (1581–1671), Sultan of Maguindanao in the Philippines

Contemporary 
Qudrat Ullah Shahab (1917–1986), Pakistani Urdu writer and civil servant
Qudratullah Abu Hamza, Pashto Afghan Taliban Politician 
Ghodratollah Alikhani, Iranian cleric
, Iranian politician
, Iranian Politician
, Iranian Politician
, Iranian politician
, Iranian general
, Iranian Cleric
, Iranian Cleric
Ghodratollah Norouzi, Iranian politician
, Iranian Director

Places 

 Qodratabad, Fahraj, Kerman Province
 Qodratabad, Narmashir, Kerman Province
 Qodratabad, Rafsanjan, Kerman Province
 Qodratabad, Azadegan, Rafsanjan County, Kerman Province
 Qodratabad, Rigan, Kerman Province
 Qodratabad, Khuzestan
 Qodratabad, Semnan
 Qodratabad, Nehbandan, South Khorasan Province

See Also
 List of Arabic theophoric names

Arabic masculine given names